The 1963 Wightman Cup was the 35th edition of the annual women's team tennis competition between the United States and Great Britain. It was held at the Cleveland Skating Club in Cleveland, Ohio in the United States.

Notable stories
Most games in a Wightman Cup set
In the second match Billie Jean Moffitt and Christine Truman consumed 36 games in deciding the second set, which Moffitt won 19–17 to conclude the match.

Second most games in a Wightman Cup set
In the third match Nancy Richey and Deidre Catt consumed 26 games in a first set eventually won 14–12 by Richey, who went on to win the match.

References

1963
1963 in tennis
1963 in American tennis
1963 in British sport
1963 in women's tennis